The British Purchasing Commission was a United Kingdom organisation of the Second World War. Also known at some time as the "Anglo-French Purchasing Board", it was based in New York City, where it arranged the production and purchase of armaments from North American manufacturers. After the 1940 French Surrender it became the 'British Purchasing Commission'. The Commission was also responsible for taking over orders that had originally been placed by France, Belgium, and later by Norway, after the capitulation of those countries.

The Board was able to arrange purchases in spite of the Neutrality Acts via "Cash and Carry", paying for the materiel with Britain's gold reserves.

The Board had been established before the war buying aircraft such as the Lockheed Super Electra.

Facing an aeroplane shortage during the early stages of World War II, in January 1940, the British government established the British Direct Purchase Commission to purchase US planes that would help supplement domestic plane production. By December 1940 British cash orders for aircraft had exceeded $1,200,000,000 with deliveries of 300-350 per month and were expected to reach 500 per month by "early in 1941". The aircraft were supplied unarmed.

The requests by the Board to US manufacturers stimulated production and design including the development and production of what would become the North American Mustang, which was designed for the Commission. Upon entry into Royal Air Force (RAF) or other Commonwealth service an Air Ministry service name was applied, thus the Consolidated 28-5 became the 'Consolidated Catalina'.

Aircraft purchased by the Commission first had to be moved across the border into Canada, due to the US' neutrality laws, it being illegal to transport 'war materials' direct from US ports. Sailing from Halifax, Nova Scotia, smaller aircraft with insufficient range to make the journey across the Atlantic were delivered to the UK by ship as cargo, with the aircraft 'knocked down' into component sections and crated. Upon arrival in the UK crated aircraft were transported to RAF Speke where they were assembled and test flown. Larger aircraft were ferried directly across the Atlantic from RCAF Gander to RAF Prestwick, first by the Atlantic Ferry Organization ("Atfero"), and subsequently by RAF Ferry Command.

After the establishment of Lend-Lease, aircraft and other weapons could be supplied direct to the UK.

Aircraft bought by the Commission
Bell Model 14/P-400 - originally allocated RAF service name "Bell Caribou", but entered RAF service as Bell Airacobra
Boeing Model 299T (B-17C) - entered RAF service as Boeing Fortress
Brewster B-339 - Belgian order for Aviation Militaire - entered RAF service as Brewster Buffalo
Brewster B-340 - Netherlands order for 162 aircraft for Militaire Luchtvaart van het Koninklijk Nederlands-Indisch Leger (ML-KNIL) but all repossessed by USN before delivery, and 750 ordered for UK - entered limited UK service as Brewster Bermuda
Consolidated LB-30 - French order for 120 for Armée de l'air. None delivered. Later taken over by UK - entered RAF service as Consolidated Liberator
Consolidated 28-5 - entered RAF service as Consolidated Catalina
Curtiss SBC-4 - French order of 50 aircraft for Aeronavale, last five delivered to UK and given service name Curtiss Cleveland
Curtiss Model 75 - French order, 316 delivered to France. Entered RAF service as Curtiss Mohawk
Curtiss Model 81A & 87 - entered RAF service as Curtiss Tomahawk (early aircraft) or Curtiss Kittyhawk (later aircraft). Packard-Merlin engined aircraft originally allocated RAF name Warhawk but on service entry 'Kittyhawk' name was applied as-per later Allison-engined variants
Curtiss P-46 - ordered by UK and allocated name Curtiss Kittyhawk but aircraft and order later cancelled and name applied to later P-40/Tomahawks incorporating more powerful Allison V-1710 engine intended for P-46.
Douglas DB-7/DB-19 - French order, 64 delivered to France. Entered RAF service as Douglas Boston (bomber) or Douglas Havoc (Intruder/Night fighter)
Douglas DB-1 - entered Royal Canadian Air Force (RCAF) service as Douglas Digby.
Douglas DC-2 - several aircraft purchased by UK, including DC-2 prototype ex-TWA NC13301, and used in India.
Grumman F4F - French order - entered Fleet Air Arm (FAA) service as Grumman Martlet, later renamed Grumman Wildcat to match US service name
Lockheed Hudson - patrol bomber designed for RAF based on Lockheed Model 14 Super Electra
Lockheed Ventura - designed for RAF - improved Hudson
Lockheed Model 322A/Model 322B - Franco-British order - tested by RAF and given service name Lockheed Lightning but order later cancelled due to poor performance
Glenn Martin Model 167 - French order for bombers- Approximately 215 of order delivered to France, remainder to UK. Entered RAF service as Martin Maryland
Glenn Martin Model 187 - Franco-British order for improved Model 167. Entered RAF service as Martin Baltimore
North American NA-64-P2 - French order for 230 trainer aircraft, 111 delivered before Fall of France. Remainder taken over by Britain and entered service with RCAF as North American Yale
North American NA-57/NA-66 - Franco-British order for improved NA-64/Harvard -  RAF service name North American Harvard
North American NA-73 - designed for RAF - entered service as North American Mustang
Northrop A-17 - French order of 93, no recorded deliveries. Transferred to UK - declared obsolete, transferred to South African Air Force (SAAF) for training - allocated RAF service name Northrop Nomad
Northrop N-3PB - Norwegian order, transferred to UK and used by Royal Norwegian Air Force (RNoAF) in exile in Little Norway, Canada, and Iceland
Vought-Sikorsky 156 - French order. 40 delivered. Another French order for 50 was later taken over by UK and the type entered limited Royal Navy (RN) service as Vought-Sikorsky Chesapeake 
Vultee P-66 - Swedish order, cancelled by US State Department after Invasion of Norway - order taken over by Britain and given service name Vultee Vanguard, but immediately after Japanese attack on Pearl Harbour all 144 aircraft built requisitioned by USAAC
Vultee Model 72 - designed for France - order taken over and entered RAF service as Vultee Vengeance

Directors General
Arthur Blaikie Purvis - 1941
Sir Clive Baillieu - 1942

Other staff of note
Mary Norton
Wilfred Hill-Wood

See also
British Security Co-ordination

References

Further reading

External links
Flight article on BPC orders and American supplies

United Kingdom defence procurement
United Kingdom–United States relations
United States in World War II